The Bolivia national under-23 football team, also known as the Bolivia Olympic football team, represents Bolivia in international football competitions during Olympic Games and Pan American Games. The selection is limited to players under the age of 23, except for three overage players. The team is controlled by the Bolivian Football Federation.

Competitive record

Olympic Games

CONMEBOL Pre-Olympic Tournament

Pan American Games

Results and fixtures

2020

Current squad
Head coach:  César Farías

The 23-man squad was announced on 7 January 2020.

Honours

 Pan American Games:
 Fourth place (1): 2007
 South American Games:
  Bronze Medalists (2): 1978, 2010
 Bolivarian Games:
  Gold Medalists (4): 1970, 1977, 2003, 2009
  Silver Medalists (2): 1938, 1947-48 (shared)
  Bronze Medalists (2): 1965, 1973 (shared)

References

Bolivia national football team
South American national under-23 association football teams